Netcompany is a Danish publicly traded IT consultancy headquartered in Copenhagen, Denmark. Since its founding in 2000, the company has grown, both domestically and internationally, into a company with 10 offices across 6 different countries.

, Netcompany employs more than 2500 staff in its offices in Denmark, United Kingdom, Norway, The Netherlands, Poland and Vietnam.

The company provides end-to-end IT services from development through to maintenance and operations to public and private organisations throughout Northern Europe.

History
The company was founded by André Rogaczewski (CEO), Claus Jørgensen (COO) and Carsten Gomard in 2000.

In 2005 the company expanded to Poland, opening an office in Warsaw.

Netcompany was privately owned up until 2006 when Danish private equity fund Axcel acquired the majority of the company's shares. In the beginning of 2011, the founders re-acquired the shares from Axcel.

In December 2015, Norwegian private equity fund FSN Capital acquired just over half of the company. According to Dagbladet Børsen, the sale price was DKK 1.1 billion.

The new ownership and resulting cash injection started the company's Northern European expansion with the acquisition of Norwegian IT consultancy Mesan AS, located in central Oslo, which at the time employed approximately 150 staff.

In January 2017 the company passed 1,000 employees becoming the first Danish startup in 20 years to do so.

In October 2017, Netcompany carried out its second acquisition, this time of UK-based Hunter Macdonald. The company employed around 250 staff (100 located in the company's Vietnam offices) and had at the time just been named United Kingdom's fastest growing IT services company

On 7 June 2018, Nasdaq Copenhagen accepted Netcompany Group A/S as a publicly traded company on the Main Market.

The following spring of 2019, Netcompany acquired the Dutch IT consultancy Qdelft, based in Delft with a staff of approximately 100 employees.

Netcompany Group acquired Luxemburg-based INTRASOFT International SA in November 2021 from Intracom Holdings. The company employed at the time more than 2,800 professionals, operating through its operational branches, subsidiaries, and offices in 13 countries.

Services
Netcompany's portfolio of services range from IT consultancy, development and implementation to change management, maintenance and operations.

The majority of the company's business is based on projects within digital platforms, core systems and infrastructure services. Additionally, the company is increasingly engaged in emerging fields like blockchain, business intelligence and machine learning, delivering services to customers such as Copenhagen Airports and the Danish National Agency for IT and Learning.

While the company's customer portfolio is roughly a 50/50 mix of private and public organisations, it is particularly within the public sector that the company has gained recognition for its solutions, especially in the home market of Denmark; in recent years, the company has been chosen as vendor for a string of high-profile, society-critical solutions, such as a new debt collection system for the Danish Tax Authority and a new communication platform for Denmark's schools, Aula, which will be used by teachers, parents and pupils alike, servicing more than 2 million users.

Digital Dogme 
In April 2018, Netcompany launched the upskilling initiative Digital Dogme together with Danske Bank, TDC and Copenhagen Airports. The purpose of the initiative is to help remedy the increasing lack of qualified IT labour force in Denmark, by cultivating the digital skills of companies' existing employees that do not possess a formal background within IT. Today more than 30 companies are part of the movement.

Subsidiaries 
Netcompany UK Ltd.

Netcompany Norway AS

Netcompany Poland Sp. Z o.o.

Netcompany Netherlands B.V.

Netcompany Vietnam Company Ltd.

Netcompany Intrasoft

References

Information technology companies of Denmark
Service companies based in Copenhagen
Danish companies established in 2009
Companies based in Copenhagen Municipality